E48 may refer to:
 E48 particulate bomb, a U.S. biological sub-munition designed during the 1950s
 The E48 series of preferred numbers
 European route E48
 HMS E48, a 1916 British E class submarine
 Sendai-Nanbu Road and Yamagata Expressway, route E48 in Japan